The Visa-Bikar 2006 was the forty-seventh season of the Icelandic national football cup. It started on 11 May 2006 and concluded with the final held on 30 September 2006. The winners qualified for the first qualifying round of the UEFA Cup 2007–08.

First round
The First Round consisted of 34 teams from lower Icelandic divisions. The matches were played on 11, 12  and 13 May 2006.

Second round
The Second Round matches were played on 18, 19  and 20 May 2006.

Third round
Third round matches were played on 30, 31 May and 1 June 2006.

Fourth round
The matches were played on 14, 15  and 16 June 2006.

Fifth round

The matches were played on 2, 3  and 6 July 2006.

Quarterfinals
The matches were played on 23  and 24 July 2006.

Semifinals
The matches were played on 28 and 29 August 2006.

Final

External links
 RSSSF Page

2006 in Icelandic football
2006 domestic association football cups
2006